The 1964 Segunda División de Chile was the 13th season of the Segunda División de Chile.

O'Higgins was the tournament's champion.

Table

See also
Chilean football league system

References

External links
 RSSSF 1964

Segunda División de Chile (1952–1995) seasons
Primera B
Chil